The 1990–91 season was Burnley's sixth season in the fourth tier of English football. They were managed by Frank Casper in his second full season in charge.

Appearances and goals

|}

A.  The "Division Four" column constitutes appearances and goals (including those as a substitute) in the Football League and play-offs.

Matches

Football League Division Four
Key

In Result column, Burnley's score shown first
H = Home match
A = Away match

pen. = Penalty kick
o.g. = Own goal

Results

Final league position

Play-offs

FA Cup

League Cup

Football League Trophy

References

1990-91
Burnley